Stallone is a given name and a surname of Italian origin, meaning either "stallion" or "cow stable". Notable persons with that name include:

Persons with the given name
 Stallone Limbombe (born 1991), Belgian footballer
 Stallone Mhlanga (born 1987), Zimbabwean Basketballer

Persons with the surname

 Frank Stallone Sr. (1919–2011), Italian-American hairdresser, polo enthusiast, writer, and one-time actor
 Frank Stallone Jr. (born 1950), American musician and actor; son of Frank and Jackie Stallone
 Jackie Stallone (1921–2020), American astrologer, dancer and women's wrestling promoter
 Sage Stallone (1976–2012), American musician, actor and film producer/director; son of Sylvester Stallone
 Sistine Stallone (born 1998), American model and actress; daughter of Sylvester Stallone
 Sylvester Stallone (born 1946), American actor, screenwriter and film producer/director; son of Frank and Jackie Stallone

References

Italian-language surnames
Given names originating from a surname
Surnames from nicknames